Arrhinactia is a genus of bristle flies in the family Tachinidae.

Species
Arrhinactia chaetosa (Townsend, 1927)
Arrhinactia cylindrica Townsend, 1927

References

Diptera of North America
Diptera of South America
Dexiinae
Tachinidae genera
Taxa named by Charles Henry Tyler Townsend